Gordon Ramsay: Uncharted is an American television series featuring Gordon Ramsay. It premiered on July 21, 2019, on the National Geographic and was broadcast in six episodes for its first season. Jon Kroll directed the series.

On April 29, 2020, it was announced that the second season would premiere on June 7, 2020.

On July 19, 2020, it was announced that the series had been renewed for a third season which was set to premiere on May 31, 2021, on National Geographic with episodes available the next day on Disney+. The first season started broadcasting on Channel 4 in the UK on July 8, 2021.

Episodes

Season 1 (2019)

Season 2 (2020)

Season 3 (2021)

References

External links

2010s American reality television series
2020s American reality television series
2019 American television series debuts
National Geographic (American TV channel) original programming
English-language television shows
Food travelogue television series